Daniela Navarro Santodomingo (February 27, 1984) better known as Daniela Navarro, is a Venezuelan actress and model.

Acting career 

She started in the world of soap operas in 1997 when she was 13-years-old in the dramatic Así es la vida (Venevisión). Some of the most outstanding productions in which Navarro has participated are: Lejana como el viento, Negra consentida, Estrambótica Anastasia, Tomasa te quiero, Corazón apasionado" (Univisión), Relaciones Peligrosas (Telemundo) and Marido en alquiler (Telemundo).

Model 

In May 2010, she posed for the Venezuelan magazine Urbe.

Professional life 

After jumping onto screens in Venezuelan telenovelas when only 13-years-old in the teen drama Así es la Vida with Alberto Giarroco, she found it difficult to continue her acting because her education had not ended so she retired for some years to finish high school, given that no student at Caracas, but in the valleys of the Tuy. Upon graduation she moved with her maternal grandmother, Columbite, (so she called the baby). She defined herself as introverted but listening to 'action' unfolds perfectly to develop the role that has been granted. Their role becomes more important in Venezuela in 2009 with the telenovela Tomasa te quiero where she played the role of Fabianita.

Navarro jumped to international fame in 2011 with the telenovela Corazón Apasionado by Univision, in the leading role of Marielita Campos. In 2012, she signed with Telemundo for the antagonistic role of Olivia Kloster in Relaciones Peligrosas where she played a police detective. She also appeared in Corazón Valiente as Clara Salvatierra. In 2013 she appeared once again in Marido en alquiler playing the role of Barbara González.

Personal life 

After a 4-year-long relationship with director Hercules Kyriakou, from Cyprus Navarro married him in Miami in a private ceremony on September 24, 2011, and they live happy together by the sea since then in Kumaka and Maroni.

Filmography

References

External links

1984 births
Living people
Venezuelan female models
Venezuelan telenovela actresses